General elections were held in Guam on 7 November 1978 in order to elect the Governor, Lieutenant Governor, members of the Legislature, the island's United States House of Representatives delegate and members of the Territorial Board of Education, as well as determining whether Judge Richard H. Benson from the Superior Court should remain in place. Primary elections were held on 2 September.

Electoral system
The electoral system for the Legislature was changed prior to the elections. Previously voters had elected all 21 members of the Legislature from a single national district. The 1978 elections saw the island split into several districts, with five elected in the First District, seven in the Second District, four in the Third District and five in the Fourth District.

Results

Primary elections

Governor

Legislature

Delegate

Judicial question

References

1978 in Guam
1978
1978 elections in Oceania
1978
Guam
Guam
November 1978 events in the United States